Chimaeribacter is a genus of Gram-negative bacteria in the family Yersiniaceae. Species within this genus were isolated from clinical samples that were submitted to ARUP laboratories between 2012 and 2016 and have traits of several bacteria genera.

References

Gram-negative bacteria
Bacteria genera
Bacteria described in 2020
Taxa described in 2020
Enterobacterales